First Round Down is a 2016 Canadian action comedy film written and directed by the Butler Brothers. The film stars Dylan Bruce as Tim Tucker, a former junior hockey star that disappeared after he blew out his knee in the Sterling Cup Championship final and returns home ten years later to look after his younger brother after his parents die. Trying to keep a low profile Tim takes a job as a pizza delivery driver but it doesn't take long for word to get around that he's back in town, especially after he delivers pizza to his ex-girlfriend, Kelly (played by Rachel Wilson), the daughter of his former coach, who is also in town for the Championship reunion. Through a series of twists and turns, it's revealed that Tim worked as a hitman the last ten years and the coach is actually targeted by his old mob boss. Tim enlists the help of his best friend, Bobby (played by Rob Ramsay) to hatch a plan that will save himself and the coach by stealing $50,000 from the reunion, and win Kelly back once and for all.

The film premiered at the 2016 Atlantic Film Festival. The US premiere was at the 2017 Gasparilla Film Festival. The film was released theatrically in Canada on May 5, 2017 by Unobstructed View, landing in the top five box office for Canadian films during its opening week and the number one film at the Carlton theater in Toronto.

Cast 

 Dylan Bruce as Tim Tucker
 Rachel Wilson as Kelly Quinn
 Rob Ramsay as Bobby Finkelman
 Peter MacNeill as Coach Quinn
 John Kapelos as Sonny
 Kristian Bruun as Winston
 Percy Hynes White as Matthew Tucker
 Joel Thomas Hynes as Jon
 Boomer Phillips as Steel Mill Bill
 Pedro Miguel Arce as Ron
 Sugith Varughese as Navin

References

External links 

 
 

2016 independent films
2016 films
Canadian action comedy films
Canadian independent films
English-language Canadian films
2016 action comedy films
Films set in Canada
Films shot in Ontario
2016 comedy films
2010s English-language films
2010s Canadian films